Church of All Saints is an Anglican church in the parish of Milton Ernest, Bedfordshire, England. It is part of the Benefice of Milton Ernest, Pavenham, and Thurleigh, in the Diocese of St. Albans under the Church of England.

History
The building as it stands presently is probably a replacement for an earlier wooden structure dating from the eleventh century.  Portions of the current Church of All Saints, such as the chancel, date to at least to the twelfth century, and expansions to the nave and aisles occurred in the fourteenth and fifteenth centuries. The architect William Butterfield heavily restored the church, including the west tower, in 1864–65. The church is still in use today, and offers both Common Worship and Book of Common Prayer services.

Churchyard
The Church of All Saints features a memorial in honor of local soldiers from Milton Ernest who perished in the Great War. The burial grounds are still active.

Protected status
Church of All Saints is a Grade I listed church as of 13 July 1964.

See also
Grade I listed buildings in Bedfordshire

References

Church of England church buildings in Bedfordshire
Grade I listed churches in Bedfordshire